A stint is a small wader in the bird genus Calidris.

Stint may also  refer to:
 Northern shoveler, a species of duck
 Stint (producer), a Canadian music producer
 Stint (electric cart), a type of four-wheeled electrically-powered cargo bike used in the Netherlands, see Oss rail accident
 Stint, a limit on the number of animals allowed on a stinted pasture
 Stint, a term in motor racing; see Glossary of motorsport terms#S

See also
 Stent (disambiguation)